Joshua S. Salmon (February 2, 1846 in Mount Olive Township, New Jersey – May 6, 1902 in Boonton, New Jersey) was an American Democratic Party politician who represented  from 1899 to 1902.

Biography
Salmon was born in Mount Olive Township, New Jersey on February 2, 1846, and at an early age moved with his parents to the community of Bartley in Mount Olive. He attended the district school and taught school for two years. He completed an academic course at the Charlotteville Seminary (in Summit, New York) and at Schooley's Mountain Seminary (in Schooley's Mountain, New Jersey), where he afterward became an instructor. He graduated from the Albany Law School in 1873, was admitted to the New York bar in 1873, to the New Jersey bar in 1875, and commenced practice in Jersey City, New Jersey. He moved to Boonton, and practiced there and in Morristown, New Jersey. He held several county offices in Morris County. He was a member of the New Jersey General Assembly in 1877 and 1878, and was prosecuting attorney of Morris County from 1893 to 1898. He was a delegate to the 1900 Democratic National Convention.

Salmon was elected as a Democrat to the Fifty-sixth and Fifty-seventh Congresses and served in office from March 4, 1899, until his death in Boonton on May 6, 1902. He was interred in Boonton's Greenwood Cemetery.

See also
List of United States Congress members who died in office (1900–49)

Notes

External links

Joshua S. Salmon at The Political Graveyard

1846 births
1902 deaths
Albany Law School alumni
Democratic Party members of the United States House of Representatives from New Jersey
New Jersey lawyers
New York (state) lawyers
People from Boonton, New Jersey
People from Mount Olive Township, New Jersey
Politicians from Morris County, New Jersey
Democratic Party members of the New Jersey General Assembly
Burials in New Jersey
19th-century American politicians